M. K. Pranesh is an Indian politician and the current  Deputy Chairman of the Karnataka Legislative Council. He is a member of the Karnataka legislative Council from the Chikmagaluru local authorities constituency.  He belongs to the Bharatiya Janata Party.

He is member of the Rashtriya Swayamsevak Sangh and has been a member of the BJP since 1989. He stepped into politics "when L.K. Advani began the rath yatra for Ram Mandir, Ayodhya". Pranesh defeated K. C. Kondaiah by securing 41 votes against 24 votes for the Deputy Chairman election in 2021.

Reference

1963 births
Bharatiya Janata Party politicians from Karnataka
Members of the Karnataka Legislative Council
Living people
Deputy Chairpersons of Karnataka Legislative Council